Tony Cooper may refer to:

Tony Cooper (footballer) in the FA Youth Cup Finals of the 1970s
Tony Cooper (trade unionist) (born 1943), British trade union leader
Tony Cooper (umpire), see 2006 ICC EAP Cricket Trophy (One day)

See also
Anthony Cooper (disambiguation)
Cooper (surname)